John Benjamins Publishing Company is an independent academic publisher in social sciences and humanities with its head office in Amsterdam, Netherlands. The company was founded in the 1960s by John and Claire Benjamins and is currently managed by their daughter Seline Benjamins. Its North American office is in Philadelphia.

John Benjamins is especially noted for its publications in language, linguistics, political linguistics and literary studies. It publishes books, as well as a number of academic journals and yearbooks, including Archiv Orientální, International Journal of Corpus Linguistics, Language Problems and Language Planning, Studies in Language, Lingvisticae Investigationes, Journal of Language and Politics and Linguistics of the Tibeto-Burman Area.

References

External links

 

Academic publishing companies
Publishing companies of the Netherlands
Book publishing companies of the Netherlands